Robert Joseph "Bob" Cappadona (born December 13, 1942) is a member of the Northeastern University athletics Hall of Fame. Cappadona was inducted in 1977 for his accomplishments in football. Cappadona also enjoyed a three-year professional football career with the Boston Patriots and Buffalo Bills. Cappadona was a stand out star at Watertown High School as well.

Northeastern University
During his time at Northeastern Cappadona helped lead Northeastern to their first undefeated season in 1963, a season in which Northeastern was invited to the first and only bowl game, the Eastern Bowl. Cappadona still finds himself near the top of many of the records for Northeastern football. During his time at Northeastern University, Cappadona was a brother of Beta Gamma Epsilon Fraternity.

Professional career
Cappadona played with both the Boston Patriots and the Buffalo Bills during its time as the AFL. Cappadona was the Patriots Rookie of the Year in 1966.

After Football
Bob Cappadona currently owns and operates a very successful insurance agency located in Watertown.  Cappadona Insurance was established in 1972.

External links
Pro-Football-Reference
 GoNU.com Hall of Fame Profile
 Watertown High School Hall of Fame Profile

1942 births
Living people
Boston Patriots players
Buffalo Bills players
Northeastern Huskies football players
Notre Dame Fighting Irish football players
American Football League players
Watertown High School (Massachusetts) alumni